Allan Vincent Browne  (28 July 1944 – 13 June 2015) was an Australian jazz drummer and composer first known for his work in The Red Onion Jazz Band in the 1960s.

Browne won the ARIA Award for Best Jazz Album in ARIA Music Awards of 1990 and ARIA Music Awards of 1996 with Paul Grabowsky Trio.

Browne was awarded the Order of Australia Medal (OAM) in 2013 for service to music as a jazz musician, and to the community.

Awards and nominations

AIR Awards
The Australian Independent Record Awards (commonly known informally as AIR Awards) is an annual awards night to recognise, promote and celebrate the success of Australia's Independent Music sector.

|-
| AIR Awards of 2010
|Une Saison En Enfer
| Best Independent Jazz Album
| 
|-
| AIR Awards of 2011
|Shreveport Stomp
| Best Independent Jazz Album
| 
|-
| AIR Awards of 2013
|Lost in the Stars 
| Best Independent Jazz Album
| 
|-
| AIR Awards of 2015
|Ithaca Bound 
| Best Independent Jazz Album
| 
|-

ARIA Music Awards
The ARIA Music Awards is an annual awards ceremony that recognises excellence, innovation, and achievement across all genres of the music of Australia. Browne was nominated for six awards.

! 
|-
| 1990
|Jumping Jazz
| Best Jazz Album
| 
| rowspan="4"| 
|-
| 1995
|Birdcalls
| Best Jazz Album
| 
|-
| 1999
|Sudden In A Shaft of Sunlight (as Browne, Haywood and Stevens)
| Best Jazz Album
| 
|-
| rowspan="2"| 2001
| rowspan="2"|East St Kilda Toodleloo 
| Best Jazz Album
| 
|-
| Best Independent Release
| 
|-
| 2011
|Shreveport Stomp 
| Best Jazz Album
| 
| rowspan="2"| 
|-
| 2015
| Ithaca Bound
| Best Jazz Album
| 
|-

Australian Jazz Bell Awards
The Australian Jazz Bell Awards, (also known as the Bell Awards or The Bells), are annual music awards for the jazz music genre in Australia. They commenced in 2003.
 (wins only)
|-
| 2003
| Collected Works – Allan Browne
| Best Australian Classic Jazz Album
| 
|-
| 2004
| Allan Browne
| Hall of Fame
| 
|-
| 2007
| Five Bells and Other Inspirations – Allan Browne's Australian Jazz Band
| Best Australian Classic Jazz Album
| 
|-
| 2010
| Homage – Sam Anning, Allan Browne, Marc Hannaford
| Best Australian Classic Jazz Album
| 
|-
| 2016
| Ithaca Bound – Allan Browne Quintet
| Best Australian Small Jazz Band
| 
|-

Don Banks Music Award
The Don Banks Music Award was established in 1984 to publicly honour a senior artist of high distinction who has made an outstanding and sustained contribution to music in Australia. It was founded by the Australia Council in honour of Don Banks, Australian composer, performer and the first chair of its music board.

|-
| 2001
| Allan Browne
| Don Banks Music Award
| 
|-

Music Victoria Awards
The Music Victoria Awards are an annual awards night celebrating Victorian music. They commenced in 2006.

! 
|-
| Music Victoria Awards of 2013
| Lost in the Stars
| Best Jazz Album
| 
|rowspan="2"|  
|-
| Music Victoria Awards of 2015
| Ithaca Bound
| Best Jazz Album
| 
|}

See also
 Paul Grabowsky Trio
The Red Onion Jazz Band

References

External links

1944 births
2015 deaths
ARIA Award winners
Australian jazz drummers
Male drummers
Australian jazz composers
Male jazz composers
Recipients of the Medal of the Order of Australia
20th-century Australian musicians
20th-century drummers
20th-century Australian male musicians
Paul Grabowsky Trio members